Charles Woods was an Australian comedian and filmmaker from the silent era. He would occasionally accompany screenings of films he had directed and give lectures.

He worked extensively on stage as an actor and in 1922 formed his own dramatic company to present plays.

Select Film Credits
The Assigned Servant (1911) – film – actor
Cooee and the Echo (1912) – film – actor
Call of the Bush (1912) – film – actor
The Bondage of the Bush (1913) – film – actor, director, writer
A Coo-ee from Home (1918) – film – director

References

External links

Year of birth missing
Year of death missing
Australian directors